Mordellistena irritans is a beetle in the genus Mordellistena of the family Mordellidae. It was described in 1991 by Franciscolo.

References

irritans
Beetles described in 1991